India has a wide following in various equestrian sports like showjumping, eventing, dressage, endurance and tent pegging. Supported by the Equestrian Federation of India, eventing is the most popular of the five, with teams representing the country at most Asian Games, winning a bronze medal in the 2002 and 2006 games. India has been represented in four Olympic Games by its equestrians in the years 1980 (Moscow), 1996 (Atlanta), 2000 (Sydney) and 2020 (Tokyo). The Equestrian Premier League aims to support the sport in the country.

Medals won in International Equestrian events

Indian Olympic Equestrians

Indian Equestrians at Asian Games

The following are medalists in the Asian Games:

External links
 Equestrian Federation of India
 Youngest Horse Riders in India honored by World Record of India

Equestrian sports in India